C. digitata may refer to:
 Callipielus digitata, a moth species found in Chile
 Cardamine digitata, the Richardson's bittercress, a plant species native of Alaska and Canada
 Callirhoe digitata, a wild flower species in the genus Callirhoe
 Crypsotidia digitata, a moth of the family Erebidae
 Cucurbita digitata, the fingerleaf gourd and bitter squash, a flowering plant species native to the southwestern United States and northern Mexico

See also